Gabrc is a small settlement in the Municipality of Sveti Jurij ob Ščavnici in northeastern Slovenia. It lies in the Slovene Hills. The area is part of the traditional Styria region and is now included in the Mura Statistical Region.

References

External links
Gabrc at Geopedia

Populated places in the Municipality of Sveti Jurij ob Ščavnici